Samuela Nabenia (born 9 February 1995) is a Fijian footballer who plays as a striker for Lautoka F.C. in the Fijian National Football League.

References

External links

1995 births
Living people
Fijian footballers
Association football forwards
Fiji international footballers
Ba F.C. players
2016 OFC Nations Cup players
Footballers at the 2016 Summer Olympics
Olympic footballers of Fiji